Prime is a 2005 American romantic comedy-drama film starring Uma Thurman, Meryl Streep, and Bryan Greenberg. It was written and directed by Ben Younger. The film grossed $67,937,503 worldwide.

Plot
Rafi is a recently divorced, 37-year-old career woman from Manhattan who becomes romantically involved with David, a talented 23-year-old painter from the Upper West Side. Rafi shares all her secrets with her therapist Lisa who, unbeknownst to Rafi, is David's mother. Lisa is supportive of Rafi's relationship with a younger man before she learns who he is, discovers the connection and finds herself not only faced with the ethical and moral dilemma of counselling David's girlfriend, but also the reality that she feels differently about the relationship now that she knows her son is involved. Lisa consults her own therapist, and they decide that it is in the best interest of her patient Rafi for Lisa to continue treatment, as long as the relationship remains the "fling" it appears to be.

However, Lisa soon realizes that the relationship is serious, and tells Rafi that she is David's mother. Feeling embarrassed and betrayed, Rafi ends her treatment with Lisa. Their differences causing problems between them, Rafi and David break up. A couple of weeks later, David is enjoying a night on the town with his best friend Morris; David gets drunk and ends up sleeping with Sue, Rafi's friend from work. The same day, after bumping into each other at the supermarket and going back to David's place, David and Rafi start seeing each other again. They also try to make the relationship stronger by going to a Friday night dinner with David's family. The rift between Rafi and Lisa is patched up, although Rafi brings up the possibility of her and David having children, to which Lisa reacts strongly. A few days later, Rafi discovers that David had slept with Sue, and David and Rafi fight. After sulking for some time, David goes to seek Lisa's help as both his mother and as a therapist. She advises him to do what he can to keep the relationship, because it was through Rafi that Lisa was able to understand David's career as an artist. David goes back to Rafi to apologize and offer to give her a child because that is what she wants the most. At first, Rafi accepts his apology. They fall into bed together, and Rafi realizes how deep David's love must be for him to make such a sacrifice—he is so much younger than she is, and having a child at his age will more than likely negatively impact his art career. Somehow, she convinces him that love is not enough to keep a relationship going, and they break up.

A year later, David and Morris are seen leaving the first restaurant where he and Rafi had their first proper date. Going back to retrieve his forgotten hat, David spots Rafi but she does not see him; he gets his hat, rushes out the door, and hides. He defrosts the glass a bit to watch her, and she turns around and sees him. They share a smile before parting.

Cast 

 Meryl Streep as Lisa Metzger Bloomberg
 Uma Thurman as Raffaela "Rafi" Gardet
 Bryan Greenberg as David Bloomberg
 Jon Abrahams as Morris
 Zak Orth as Randall
 Annie Parisse as Katherine
 Aubrey Dollar as Michelle
 Jerry Adler as Sam
 Doris Belack as Blanch
 Ato Essandoh as Damien
 Naomi Aborn as Dinah Bloomberg
 John Rothman as Jack Bloomberg
 Madhur Jaffrey as Rita
 Lotte Mandel as Bubi
 Alex Webb as Art Collector

Production 
 
The role of Rafi was originally going to be played by Sandra Bullock. Bullock completed rehearsals with Younger and Greenberg, but pulled out just before filming began, because she wanted major script changes, and the director was not willing to change the script.

Bryan Greenberg's trip to New York to film this movie is documented as part of HBO's semi-reality series Unscripted.

Music 
The film's original score was composed by Ryan Shore.

Soundtrack

The soundtrack is a mix of different music genres such as jazz and pop.
The composer of this soundtrack is Ryan Shore.

 RJD2 – "Ghostwriter" (Remix)
 Duke Ellington & John Coltrane – "In a Sentimental Mood"
 Rufus Wainwright – "Peach Trees"
 Ryan Shore – "Rafi and David"
 Le Tigre – "Fake French"
 Stacey Kent – "Isn't This a Lovely Day?"
 Daniel Merriweather – "Still Got Me" 
 Ray LaMontagne – "Shelter"
 Debi Nova – "Laylo" 
 Sidsel Endresen & Bugge Wesseltoft – "Try"
 Rachael Yamagata – "I Wish You Love"
 Ryan Shore – "Prime Suite"

Reception

Critical response 
 
Rotten Tomatoes gave the film score of 50% based on 117 reviews.
Metacritic gave the film a weighted mean score of 58% based on 32 reviews.

Though critics had dislike for the film’s plot mechanics, the performances, especially Streep and Thurman’s, were praised. In a three-star review, Roger Ebert wrote “Streep has that ability to cut through the solemnity of a scene with a zinger that reveals how all human effort is, after all, comic at some level.”

Lisa Schwarzbaum of Entertainment Weekly wrote, “Prime (written and directed by Boiler Room‘s Ben Younger) is much more interested in the interpretation of dreams than how a hottie like Thurman could be interested in a blandy like Greenberg’s [character].”

Box office
The film opened at #3 at the U.S. box office, making $6,220,935 USD in its opening weekend, behind The Legend of Zorro and Saw II.

References

External links 
 
 
 
 
 Soundtrack at CDuniverse

2005 films
2005 romantic comedy-drama films
American romantic comedy-drama films
Films directed by Ben Younger
Films set in New York City
Psychotherapy in fiction
Universal Pictures films
2005 comedy films
2005 drama films
Films produced by Suzanne Todd
Films scored by Ryan Shore
Films about mother–son relationships
2000s English-language films
2000s American films